This article lists transport in Equatorial Guinea.

Railways 

There are currently no railways in Equatorial Guinea.

Maps

Highways 
There are 2,880 km (1,790 mi) of highways in Equatorial Guinea, the majority of which were not paved in 2002.  Equatorial Guinea's roads and highways are underdeveloped, but improving. During the rainy season, roads are frequently impassable without four-wheel drive vehicles.

Furthermore, the country has recently built a 175-km long two-lane expressway that runs between Bata and President Obiang Nguema International Airport, and it is expected to soon reach the city of Mongomo, located on the border with Gabon.

Merchant marine 

Airports 

There are seven airports in Equatorial Guinea. Its main airport is Malabo International Airport in Punta Europa, Bioko Island. International flights operate from:

 Madrid (Spain): Ceiba Intercontinental (4 flights per week)
 Paris (France): Air France (3 flights per week)
 Frankfurt (Germany): Lufthansa (3 flights per week)
 Casablanca (Marroco): Royal Air Marroc ( 2 flights per week)
 Istanbul (Turkey): Turkish Airlines (1 flight per week)
 Cotonou (Benin): Cronos Airlines (2 flights per week)
 Abidjan (Ivory Coast): Ceiba Intercontinental (3 flights per week)
 Accra (Ghana): Ceiba Intercontinental (3 flights per week);
 Sao Tome (Sao Tome y Príncipe): Ceiba Intercontinental (3 flights per week);
 Douala (Cameroon) Ethiopian Airline (3 flights per week); Cronos Airlines (3 flights per week)
 Libreville (Gabon): Royal Air Marrocc (2 flights per week)
 Port Harcourt (Nigeria): Cronos Airlines  (2 flights per week)
 Addis Abeba (Ethiopia): Ethiopian Airlines (3 flights per week)

From Malabo airport, you can fly to any of the other airports in the country. These airports are located in the region of Annobón, Bata, Mongomoyen, and Corisco.

See also 
 Economy of Equatorial Guinea
 Equatorial Guinea
 List of airports in Equatorial Guinea

References